The 2019 K League 2 was the seventh season of the K League 2, the second-tier South Korean professional league for association football clubs since its establishment in 2013, and the second one with its current name, the K League 2. The top-ranked team and the winners of the promotion play-offs among three clubs ranked between second and fourth got promoted to the 2020 K League 1.

Teams
Since the champions from the previous season, Asan Mugunghwa, didn't get promoted because of administrative reasons, Seongnam FC, the second-placed team of the 2018 K League 2, was granted promotion to the 2019 K League 1. Jeonnam Dragons were relegated from the top tier. A total of ten teams contested in the league.

Stadiums

Personnel and kits

Note: Flags indicate national team as has been defined under FIFA eligibility rules. Players may hold more than one non-FIFA nationality.

Managerial changes

Foreign players
Restricting the number of foreign players strictly to four per team, including a slot for a player from AFC countries. A team could use four foreign players on the field each game. Players in bold  are players who joined midway through the competition. Note that An Byong-jun, who is a North Korean player playing for Suwon FC, was deemed to be a native player.

League table

Positions by matchday

Round 1–18

Round 19–36

Results

Matches 1–18

Matches 19–36

Promotion-relegation playoffs
The Semi-playoff was contested between the 3rd and 4th placed teams in the K League 2. The winners advanced to the Playoff to face the 2nd placed team in the K League 2, and the winners advanced to the Promotion-relegation playoffs to match against the 11th placed team in the K League 1. The winners of that tie secured a place in the 2020 K League 1.

If scores were tied after regular time in the Semi-playoff and Playoff rounds, the higher-placed team would advance to the next phase. The same conditions did not apply for the Promotion-relegation playoffs, which was instead over two legs.

Semi-playoff

Playoff

Promotion-relegation playoffs

First leg

Second leg

Busan IPark won 2–0 on aggregate.

Season statistics

Top scorers

Top assists

Attendance

References

External links
 Official K League website 

K League 2 seasons
2
K